Ragnar Sørensen (February 16, 1915 – February 3, 1998) was a Norwegian cinematographer.

Sørensen made his debut as a camera assistant for the Norwegian film comedy Den forsvundne pølsemaker (1941) and as a focus puller for the comedy En herre med bart (1942). He made his debut as chief photographer with Nils R. Müller's Så møtes vi imorgen (1946). He soon became one of Norway's leading photographers with major assignments for directors such as Arne Skouen, Kåre Bergstrøm, Rasmus Breistein, and Tancred Ibsen. He particularly excelled in the black-and-white medium, and his most famous assignments were Arne Skouen's debut film Gategutter (1949), Tancred Ibsen's Storfolk og småfolk (1951), Kåre Bergstrøm and Radoš Novaković's Blodveien (1955), and Bergstrøm's De dødes tjern (1958, which was also the first Norwegian film created with CinemaScope). In the 1960s, he was the cinematographer for Tancred Ibsen's Venner  (1960), Nils Reinhardt Christensen's Line (1961), and Arne Skouen's Om Tilla (1963). In 1969 he was the cinematographer for Himmel og helvete, which was also his last feature film.

Sørensen was the cinematographer for 26 feature films, and he also directed some of the short documentary films about Oslo (collectively known as the Oslo films): Klipp fra Oslo kinematografers arkiv (1955),  Nye forstadsbaner i Oslo (1958), and Oslo havn (1957).

In 1961 he received the Aamot Award for his work.

Filmography

 1941: Den forsvundne pølsemaker
 1942: En herre med bart
 1943: Den nye lægen
 1946: Så møtes vi imorgen
 1948: Den hemmelighetsfulle leiligheten
 1949: Gategutter
 1950: Det store varpet
 1951: Storfolk og småfolk
 1952: Andrine og Kjell
 1952: Det kunne vært deg
 1955: Blodveien
 1956: Gylne ungdom
 1956: Toya
 1957: Ni liv
 1957: Toya & Heidi
 1958: De dødes tjern
 1959: Støv på hjernen
 1960: Millionær for en aften
 1960: Venner
 1961: Line
 1961: Sønner av Norge
 1962: Kalde spor
 1962: Prozor u svet
 1962: Sønner av Norge kjøper bil
 1963: Om Tilla
 1964: Pappa tar gull
 1969: Himmel og helvete

References

External links
 
 Ragnar Sørensen at the Swedish Film Database

1915 births
1998 deaths
Norwegian cinematographers
People from Oslo